Frederick Frelinghuysen (September 30, 1848 – January 1, 1924) was an American businessman. He was the president of the Mutual Benefit Life Insurance Company in Newark, New Jersey, for 25 years.

Early life
Frelinghuysen was born on September 30, 1848 in Newark, New Jersey. He was a son of Frederick Theodore Frelinghuysen and Matilda Elizabeth Griswold (who was of English descent). His siblings included: Matilda Griswold Frelinghuysen (who married prominent merchant Henry Winthrop Gray); Charlotte Louisa Frelinghuysen; George Griswold Frelinghuysen; m. Sara Linen Ballantine (granddaughter of Peter Ballantine) prominent New York clubman Theodore Frelinghuysen; and Sarah Helen Frelinghuysen (who married Judge John Davis, and after his death, Brig. Gen. Charles Laurie McCawley).  His father was a lawyer who served as a U.S. Senator and later as Secretary of State under President Chester A. Arthur.

His paternal grandparents were Frederick Frelinghuysen and Mary (née Dumont) Frelinghuysen. His grandfather died when his father was just three years old, so his father was adopted by his uncle, Theodore Frelinghuysen.  Both grandfather and adopted grandfather were sons of Frederick Frelinghuysen, the eminent lawyer who was one of the framers of the first New Jersey Constitution, a soldier in the American Revolutionary War, a member of the Continental Congress, and a member of the United States Senate. His maternal grandfather George Griswold, was a merchant in New York City who "made an immense fortune in the time of the clipper trade with China."

He graduated from Rutgers College in 1868.

Career
Frelinghuysen was admitted to the bar as an attorney in 1871 and as a counselor in 1874.  He became president of the Howard Savings Institution. He resigned that post to become president of the Mutual Benefit Life Insurance Company.

Personal life
On July 23, 1902, he was married to Estelle Burnet Kinney (1868–1931), a daughter of Thomas Talmadge Kinney and Estelle Burnet (née Condit) Kinney. Her paternal grandfather was Chargé d'Affaires to the Kingdom of Sardinia William Burnet Kinney (whose second wife was writer Elizabeth Clementine Stedman). Together, they lived in Elberon, New Jersey and were the parents of four sons and one daughter including:

 Frederick Frelinghuysen (1903–1966), who married Elizabeth (née Lyman) Harrower, a daughter of Maj. Ronald T. Lyman and Elizabeth Van Cortlandt (née Parker) Lyman, in 1937. She was the former wife of Gordon Harrower.
 Thomas Talmadge Kinney Frelinghuysen (b. 1905), a sculptor who married Roselyne de Viry, a daughter of Baron Humbert and Baroness Delphine Marie de Viry, of Thonon-les-Bains, Haute Savoie, and Shipton Court, Lenox, Massachusetts (today the Seven Hills Inn), in 1949.
 Theodore Frelinghuysen (b. 1907).
 George Griswold Frelinghuysen II (1908–2002), who married Anne de Smolianinof, a daughter of Grand Master of Imperial Court Vladimir N. de Smolianinof, in 1934.
 Estelle C. "Suzy" Frelinghuysen (1911–1988), who married fellow painter George Lovett Kingsland Morris.

He died in the Post Graduate Hospital after a three-week illness in Manhattan, New York City on January 1, 1924. His widow died on May 13, 1931.

References
Notes

Sources

External links

Frelinghuysen family
1848 births
1924 deaths
Rutgers University alumni
American people of Dutch descent
American people of English descent
Businesspeople from Newark, New Jersey